Charles W. Lindberg (June 26, 1920 – June 24, 2007) was a United States Marine Corps corporal who fought in three island campaigns during World War II. During the Battle of Iwo Jima, he was a member of the patrol that captured the top of Mount Suribachi where he helped raise the first U.S. flag on the island on February 23, 1945. Six days later, he was wounded in action.
 
The first flag flown over the southern end of Iwo Jima was regarded to be too small to be seen by the thousands of Marines fighting on the other side of the mountain where the Japanese airfields and most of their troops were located, so it was replaced the same day with a larger flag. Although there were photographs taken of the first flag flying on Mount Suribachi and some which include Lindberg, there is no photograph of Marines raising the first flag. The second flag-raising was photographed by Associated Press combat photographer Joe Rosenthal and became famous after copies of his photograph appeared in the newspapers two days later. Lindberg spent decades trying to bring awareness of the first flag raising and his participation in it.

The Marine Corps War Memorial in Arlington, Virginia, is modeled after the historic photograph of six Marines raising the second flag on Iwo Jima.

U.S. Marine Corps

World War II 
Lindberg was born and lived in Grand Forks, North Dakota, when he enlisted in the Marine Corps shortly after the Japanese Navy attack on Pearl Harbor. After completing recruit training, he volunteered for the Marine Raiders, a special unit of the Marine Corps. Lindberg first saw combat on Guadalcanal while serving as a member of the 2nd Raider Battalion ("Carlson's Raiders"), and participated in the "Long Patrol". He also saw combat with the 2nd Raiders on Bougainville. In February 1944, the Marine Raider (and Paramarine) units were disbanded and he returned to the United States. He was reassigned to the newly activated 5th Marine Division at Camp Pendleton, California. After training at Camp Pendleton, the division was sent to and trained in Hawaii before leaving for Iwo Jima.

Battle of Iwo Jima 
Lindberg was assigned as a flamethrower operator in 3rd Platoon, E Company, 2nd Battalion, 28th Marine Regiment, 5th Marine Division. On February 19, 1945, he landed with the fifth assault wave on the southeast beach of Iwo Jima closest to Mount Suribachi, which was the 28th Marine Regiment's objective. Because of heavy fighting, the base of Mount Suribachi was not reached and surrounded until February 22. On February 23, flamethrower operators Cpl. Lindberg and Pvt. Robert Goode of E Company were members of the 40-man combat patrol that climbed up Mount Suribachi to seize and occupy the crest and raise the Second Battalion's American flag. On March 1, Lindberg was shot in the right forearm by a Japanese sniper and was evacuated off the island. He received the Silver Star for gallantry in action on Iwo Jima from February 19 to March 1, 1945 (Pvt. Goode was also wounded on March 1 and awarded the Silver Star).

First flag raising 

On February 23, 1945, Lieutenant Colonel Chandler W. Johnson, commander of the 2nd Battalion, 28th Marine Regiment, ordered a platoon-size patrol to climb up 556-foot Mount Suribachi. First Lieutenant Harold Schrier, E Company's executive officer, was handed the Second Battalion's American flag from Lt. Colonel Johnson (or the battalion adjutant) measuring 28 by 54 inches (137 by 71 cm) which had been taken from the attack transport  on the way to Iwo Jima by First Lieutenant George G. Wells the Second Battalion's adjutant in charge of the battalion's flags. Lt. Schrier was to it take a patrol with the flag up the mountain and raise the flag if possible at the summit to signal that Mount Suribachi was captured and the top secure. Captain Dave Severance, E Company's commander, assembled the remainder of his Third Platoon and other member of the battalion including two Navy corpsmen and stretcher bearers. At 8:30 a.m., Lt. Schrier started climbing with the patrol up the mountain. Less than an hour later, the patrol, after receiving occasional Japanese sniper fire, reached the rim of the volcano. A brief firefight with the Japanese occurred, Lt. Schrier and his men captured the summit.

A section of a Japanese steel pipe was found on the mountain and the battalion's flag Lt. Schrier carried was tied on to it by Lt. Schrier, Sgt. Henry Hansen and Cpl. Lindberg (Platoon Sergeant Ernest Thomas was watching inside the group with a grenade in his hand while Pvt. Phil Ward held the bottom end of the pipe horizontally off the ground). The flagstaff was then carried to the highest part on the crater and raised by Lt. Schrier, Platoon Sgt. Thomas, Sgt. Hansen, and Cpl. Lindberg at approximately 10:30 a.m. Seeing the national colors flying caused loud cheering from the Marines, sailors, and Coast Guardsmen on the beach below and from the men on the ships near and docked at the beach. Due to the strong wind on Mount Suribachi, Sgt. Hansen, Pvt. Ward, and Third Platoon corpsman John Bradley helped make the flagstaff stay in a vertical position. The men at, around, and holding the flagstaff which included Schrier's radioman Raymond Jacobs (assigned to patrol from F Company), were photographed several times by Staff Sgt. Louis R. Lowery, a photographer with Leatherneck magazine who accompanied the patrol up the mountain. A firefight with some Japanese soldiers took place, an enemy grenade caused Sgt. Lowery to fall down which damaged his camera but not his film. Platoon Sgt. Thomas was killed on March 3 and St. Hansen was killed on March 1.

Second flag raising 

Lt. Colonel Johnson decided about two hours or more later after the flag was raised, that a larger flag should replace it. The flag was too small to be seen on the other side of the mountain where the Japanese airfields and most of the Japanese troops were located, the thousands of Marines fighting there needed the inspiration from seeing the flag. While Lindberg was reloading his flamethrower tanks below Mount Suribachi, a 96 by 56 inch flag was obtained from a ship docked on shore and brought up to the top of Mount Suribachi by Pfc. Rene Gagnon the Second Battalion's runner (messenger) for E Company. At the same time, Sgt. Michael Strank, Cpl. Harlon Block, Pfc. Franklin Sousley, and Pfc. Ira Hayes from Second Platoon, E Company, were sent to take supplies up to Third Platoon and raise the second flag. Once on top, the flag was attached to another Japanese steel pipe and raised by the four Marines and  Pfc. Harold Schultz and Pfc. Harold Keller both whom had gone up Suribachi with the 40-man patrol. At the same time the second flag was raised, the original flag was lowered and taken down the mountain to the battalion adjutant by Pfc. Gagnon. Sgt. Strank and Cpl. Block were killed on March 1. Pfc. Sousley was killed on March 21.

Joe Rosenthal's (Associated Press) historical flag-raising photograph of the second flag-raising on Mount Suribachi appeared in Sunday newspapers on February 25, 1945, as the flag-raising on Mount Suribachi. This flag raising was also filmed in color by Marine Sgt. Bill Genaust (killed in action in March) and was used in newsreels. Other combat photographers with and besides Rosenthal ascended the mountain after the first flag was raised and the mountaintop secured. These photographers including Rosenthal and an army photographer who was assigned to cover Marine amphibious landings for Yank Magazine, took photos of Marines, corpsmen, and themselves, around both of the flags. The second flag-raisers received national recognition. The three survivors (two were found out to be incorrectly identified) of the flag raising were called to Washington, D.C. after the battle by President Franklin D. Roosevelt to participate in a bond tour to raise much needed money to pay for the war. The Marines who captured Mount Suribachi and those who raised the first flag, including Lindberg, generally did not receive the national recognition that was due to them even though the first flag raising was the first to receive some public recognition.

Post-war and later life 

Lindberg was honorably discharged from the Marine Corps in January 1946, and returned home to Grand Forks, North Dakota. He married, moved to Richfield, Minnesota, in 1951, where he raised two daughters and three sons, and worked as an electrician for 39 years. In the 1970s, he began telling his story about the capture of Mount Suribachi and the first American flag raising on top of which he had actually participated in, only to have his story called into question, until more of the facts of the first flag-raising became better known and accepted by the general public. He often spoke at schools, sharing some of his wartime memories of Iwo Jima and World War II with the children. In 1995, he returned to Iwo Jima for the 50th anniversary of the battle of Iwo Jima. In November 2006, he attended his last reunion of Third Platoon, E Company, 28th Marines, which was held in Washington, D.C.

Marine Corps War Memorial

 
The Marine Corps War Memorial (also known as the Iwo Jima Memorial) in Arlington, Virginia, which was inspired by Joe Rosenthal's photograph of the second flag-raising atop Mount Suribachi by six Marines on February 23, 1945, was dedicated on November 10, 1954 (179th anniversary of the Marine Corps). Harold Schrier, Charles Lindberg, and Lou Lowery, attended the dedication ceremony as guests.

President Dwight D. Eisenhower sat upfront during the dedication ceremony with Vice President Richard Nixon, Secretary of Defense Charles E. Wilson, Deputy Secretary of Defense Robert Anderson, and General Lemuel C. Shepherd, the 20th Commandant of the Marine Corps. Ira Hayes, one of the three surviving flag raisers depicted on the monument, was also seated upfront with John Bradley (incorrectly identified as a flag raiser until 2016), Rene Gagnon (incorrectly identified as a flag raiser until October 16, 2019), Mrs Martha Strank, Mrs. Ada Belle Block, and Mrs. Goldie Price (mother of Franklin Sousley). Those giving remarks at the dedication included Robert Anderson, Chairman of Day; Colonel J.W. Moreau, U.S. Marine Corps (Retired), President, Marine Corps War Memorial Foundation; General Shepherd, who presented the memorial to the American people; Felix de Weldon, sculptor; and Richard Nixon, who gave the dedication address. Inscribed on the memorial are the following words:

In Honor And Memory Of The Men of The United States Marine Corps Who Have Given Their Lives To Their Country Since 10 November 1775

Death 

Lindberg died at Fairview Southdale Hospital in Edina, Minnesota, on June 24, 2007. In a tribute to Lindberg, KARE TV ran the following report:

 At Fort Snelling, Friday, June 29th, 2007 the nation bid farewell to a true World War II hero. Marine Chuck Lindberg was laid to rest at Fort Snelling National Cemetery.
 The thundering jet fighters and some vintage WWII planes flew overhead to pay tribute. And it was well deserved.
 Lindberg was the last survivor of the first flag-raising on Iwo Jima's Mount Suribachi. But his moment was overshadowed by a second flag-raising. He spent a lifetime correcting the record.
 Still, on this Friday at Fort Snelling, there was no doubt about history's record.
 During the ceremony one of Lindberg's daughters, Diane Steiger said, "The angels needn't worry tonight, another Marine has arrived. Our hero has gone home, the heavens are safer tonight."

Chuck Lindberg's bronze bust is the center piece of The Honoring All Veterans Memorial in Veterans Park in Richfield, Minnesota.

Military awards 
Lindberg's military decorations and awards include:

Silver Star Medal citation
Lindberg's Silver Star Medal citation reads:

Citation:

Portrayal in films
In the film Flags of Our Fathers (2006), Lindberg is played by Alessandro Mastrobuono. Lindberg is the only character to appear in both Flags of Our Fathers and its companion film, Letters from Iwo Jima, although in the latter, he is uncredited and simply seen in the same shot of both films, rushing towards a bunker with a flamethrower.

Public honors
The Freedom Defenders Veterans Memorial (Lindberg statue and plaque, 2006) in Bemidji, Minnesota.
 The Charles "Chuck" W. Lindberg Electrical Training Center (2007) in St. Michael, Minnesota

See also

List of U.S. Marines
Last Iwo Jima Flag Raiser and IBEW Member Charles Lindberg Dies

References

External links
The Honoring All Veterans Memorial, Richfield, MN
New York Times Obituary
Yahoo news story

1920 births
2007 deaths
United States Marine Corps personnel of World War II
United States Marine Corps non-commissioned officers
Marine Raiders
People from Grand Forks, North Dakota
Military personnel from North Dakota
Battle of Iwo Jima
Recipients of the Silver Star